Powell is a community in the Canadian province of Manitoba. It is part of a group of five communities in the region, all built to serve logging operations in the Porcupine Provincial Forest. The others are National Mills, Baden, Red Deer Lake, and the largest, Barrows, where the nearest school and fire service are located. The community contains eight housing units.

Demographics 

References

Designated places in Manitoba
Northern communities in Manitoba